The Mammoth Book of Mindblowing SF is an anthology of science fiction short stories edited by Mike Ashley, and published in 2009.

Reception
The anthology attracted substantial criticism because all authors were white men. In Strange Horizons, Graham Sleight reviewed it negatively, noting that "whole worlds of human experience are largely absent from this book—the sexual, the interpersonal, the everyday" and concluding that the anthology was "damaged by its narrowness" in attempting to evoke a sense of wonder through technophilia.

Contents
An asterisk (*) denotes stories original to the anthology. 
Out of the Sun by Arthur C. Clarke
The Pevatron Rats by Stephen Baxter *
The Edge of the Map by Ian Creasey
Cascade Point by Timothy Zahn
A Dance to Strange Musics by Gregory Benford
Palindromic by Peter Crowther
Castle in the Sky by Robert Reed *
The Hole in the Hole by Terry Bisson
Hotrider by Keith Brooke
Mother Grasshopper by Michael Swanwick
Waves and Smart Magma by Paul Di Filippo *
The Black Hole Passes by John Varley
The Peacock King by Ted White and Larry McCombs
Bridge by James Blish
Anhedonia by Adam Roberts *
Tiger Burning by Alastair Reynolds
The Width of the World by Ian Watson
Our Lady of the Sauropods by Robert Silverberg
Into the Miranda Rift by G. David Nordley
The Rest is Speculation by Eric Brown *
Vacuum States by Geoffrey A. Landis

References

Science fiction anthologies
2009 anthologies